Evan Murphy (born March 25, 1988) is an American professional racing cyclist. He rode in the men's team time trial at the 2015 UCI Road World Championships.

References

External links

1988 births
Living people
American male cyclists
Place of birth missing (living people)